Jessica Dominique Marais (born 29 January 1985) is a South African-born Australian actress best known for her roles on Australian television in Packed to the Rafters and Love Child. She also co-starred on the American drama series Magic City.

Early life
Born in Johannesburg, South Africa, Marais and her family lived in Canada and New Zealand before relocating to Perth, Western Australia, when she was nine.  Six months after arriving in Australia, Marais' father Tony died from a heart attack while returning from a family picnic. Marais and her younger sister Clara were raised by her mother Karen. She attended a Catholic co-educational school John XXIII College in Claremont for a year.

Jessica attended the National Institute of Dramatic Art where she graduated in 2007. NIDA appearances included Ophelia in William Shakespeare's Hamlet and Charity in Sweet Charity. While still completing her final year she won the role in Packed to the Rafters, along with co-star and fellow NIDA graduate Hugh Sheridan.

Career
Marais was attending NIDA when she was cast in the role of Rachel Rafter on the television series Packed to the Rafters. The series became a success and was instantly renewed. In February 2011 it was announced that Marais had left the show, with her final episode airing on 23 August 2011. Marais starred in the series from Season One until Season Four from 2008 to 2012. Marais made cameo appearances in the final episode of season 4 on 20 March 2012 and in the series finale on 2 July 2013. After initially agreeing to reprise the role of Rachel Rafter in Back to the Rafters, which premiered on Amazon Prime Video on 17 September 2021, she pulled out before filming began for personal reasons.

Marais also starred in Rai Fazio's film Two Fists, One Heart with fellow Perth actor Tim Minchin and Daniel Amalm which was released in March 2009. Marais guest-starred in the American series, Legend of the Seeker filmed in Auckland New Zealand, playing the role of the Mord'Sith Denna.

After departing Packed to the Rafters, Marais relocated to Los Angeles to pursue a career in Hollywood. Marais then went to Miami, to film US drama, Magic City. The series lasted two seasons.

After relocating back to Australia, Marais portrayed Australian transgender entertainer and activist Carlotta in a biographic telefilm for ABCTV Australia. Its worldwide premiere was on 19 June 2014. It was the No. 10 show of the night, and nationally won its timeslot with 811,000 viewers. Also in 2014, Marais had the lead role on Channel Nine's Love Child, where she played the character Dr Joan Millar. She has since appeared on all four seasons of this show.

Since 2016, Marais had the lead role in Channel Ten's drama The Wrong Girl. Marais was nominated for the Gold Logie in 2017 and 2018

Personal life
Marais was engaged to former Packed to the Rafters co-star James Stewart in 2009. However, in May 2015 Marais announced that she and Stewart had ended their 5-year engagement amicably.

Marais and Stewart have a daughter together born in May 2012.  Marais was reported as saying she would return to work filming the second series of Magic City while Stewart would be the baby's full-time caregiver.

Filmography

Awards
Marais has won, and been nominated, for seven Logies in her time.

Her first success at the Logies was in 2009, when she won the Logie for "Most Popular New Female Talent" and the prestigious Graham Kennedy Award for "Most Outstanding New Talent" for her role on Packed to the Rafters. For her role on this show, she was nominated for the Gold Logie in 2011 and nominated for "Most Popular Actress" in 2010, 2011 and 2012.

In 2015, she was nominated for the "Most Outstanding Actress" for her role in Carlotta, and also nominated for the "Most Popular Actress" award for her roles in Carlotta and Love Child.

Marais won "Most Popular Actress" in 2016 (for Love Child) and 2017 (for Love Child and The Wrong Girl). Also in 2017, she was nominated for the Gold Logie and "Most Outstanding Actress" in 2017 (also for her role in Love Child).

References

External links

Jessica Marais Fan Site (unofficial)
Q&A with Jessica Marais on Playing Carlotta

1985 births
Actresses from Perth, Western Australia
Afrikaner people
Australian film actresses
Australian television actresses
Living people
Logie Award winners
National Institute of Dramatic Art alumni
People educated at John XXIII College, Perth
People educated at St Hilda's Anglican School for Girls
People from Johannesburg
South African emigrants to Australia
South African film actresses
South African people of French descent
South African television actresses